Darcisio Paulo Perondi (born 2 April 1947) is a Brazilian politician and pediatrician. He has spent his political career representing São Paulo, having served as federal deputy representative from 1995 to 2011 and from 2015.

Personal life
Before entering politics in 1993 Perondi worked as a pediatrician at the local hospital in Ijuí.

Political career
Perondi voted in favor of the impeachment against then-president Dilma Rousseff and political reformation. He would later vote in against opening a corruption investigation against Rousseff's successor Michel Temer, and voted in favor of the 2017 Brazilian labor reforms.

Perondi was initially not elected to the federal deputy in the 2018, but was chosen as Osmar Terra's successor in the legislature  after the latter was appointed to president-elect Jair Bolsonaro's cabinet.

References

1947 births
Living people
People from Ijuí
Brazilian pediatricians
Brazilian Democratic Movement politicians
Members of the Chamber of Deputies (Brazil) from Rio Grande do Sul
Members of the Legislative Assembly of Rio Grande do Sul

Brazilian people of Italian descent